Ren Xiangyu (born 23 October 1998) is a Chinese badminton player. Born in Luzhou, Sichuan province, he has shown his talent in badminton since he was a child. He once trained at the Luzhou sports school, and entered the national team in 2016. He helped the junior national team to clinch the mixed team titles at the 2015 and 2016 Asian Junior Championships, and also at the 2015 and 2016 World Junior Championships. He claimed his first senior international title at the 2018 U.S. Open in the men's doubles event partnered with Ou Xuanyi.

Achievements

BWF World Junior Championships 
Boys' doubles

Asian Junior Championships 
Boys' doubles

BWF World Tour (2 titles, 3 runners-up) 
The BWF World Tour, which was announced on 19 March 2017 and implemented in 2018, is a series of elite badminton tournaments sanctioned by the Badminton World Federation (BWF). The BWF World Tour is divided into levels of World Tour Finals, Super 1000, Super 750, Super 500, Super 300, and the BWF Tour Super 100.

Men's doubles

Mixed doubles

BWF International Challenge/Series (1 title) 
Mixed doubles

References

External links 
 

1998 births
Living people
People from Luzhou
Badminton players from Sichuan
Chinese male badminton players
21st-century Chinese people